Tiptop is an unincorporated community located in Tazewell County, Virginia, United States. Tip Top was named for being the highest elevated point on the Norfolk and Western Railroad.

References

Unincorporated communities in Tazewell County, Virginia
Unincorporated communities in Virginia